The 2020–21 Jackson State Tigers basketball team represented Jackson State University in the 2020–21 NCAA Division I men's basketball season. The Tigers, led by eighth-year head coach Wayne Brent, played their home games at the Williams Assembly Center in Jackson, Mississippi as members of the Southwestern Athletic Conference.

Previous season
The Tigers finished the 2019–20 season 15–17, 11–7 in SWAC play to finish in a three-way tie for fourth place. They defeated Alcorn State in the quarterfinals of the SWAC tournament, and were set to face Prairie View A&M in the semifinals until the tournament was cancelled amid the COVID-19 pandemic.

Roster

Schedule and results 

|-
!colspan=12 style=| Non-conference regular season

|-
!colspan=12 style=| SWAC regular season

|-
!colspan=12 style=| SWAC tournament
|-

|-

Sources

References

Jackson State Tigers basketball seasons
Jackson State Tigers
Jackson State Tigers basketball
Jackson State Tigers basketball